The Dumaresq family was a patrician family in the Channel Islands with a particularly strong presence in Jersey. The family would hold many offices and positions throughout the history of Jersey from the 13th century.

Origins 
The family is said to come from Norman origins where the original members of the family arrived in Jersey; however, the family is first mentioned in Jersey during the year 1292 on the Exchequer, 21 Edward I, where it mentions a Jordan Du Maresq who was a Jurat of the Royal Court of Jersey.

Titles 
The Dumaresq family held the following titles:

 Seigneur of Augres
 Seigneur of La Haule
 Seigneur of Samarès
 Seigneur of Vincheles de Bas

Notable Members 
 Rev. Daniel Dumaresq FRS
 Rear-Admiral John Saumarez Dumaresq CB, CVO
 Elias Dumaresq, 5th Seigneur of Augres
 John Dumaresq, Seigneur of Vincheles de Bas
 Lieutenant Colonel John Dumaresq
 Elias Dumaresq, 3rd Seigneur des Augres
 Sir John Dumaresq
Captain Philip Dumaresq, Seigneur of Samarès
Captain Philip Dumaresq (Captain of HMS Victory)
 Lieutenant Colonel Henry Dumaresq (1792–1838)
 Elizabeth Dumaresq (wife of Sir Ralph Darling, Governor of New South Wales)
 Admiral Thomas Dumaresq (1729–1802)
 Thomas Dumaresq, Seigneur of Vinchelez de Bas and of Gorge
Henry Dumaresq, Seigneur of Samarès
Charles Dumaresq, Lieutenant Bailiff of Jersey (1712–1713)
 Captain William John Dumaresq (1793–1868)
Captain Edward Dumaresq (1802–1906)
Charles Édouard Armand-Dumaresq KSS
James Dumaresq
Edward Dumaresq

References

Families
Jersey
Channel Islands families